Douentza Sign Language, or Dogon Sign Language is a community sign language spoken in Douentza and neighboring communities in the Dogon country in Mali. It is unknown how similar it may be to the nearby village sign language, Tebul Sign Language, but it may be unrelated to another sign language of the Dogon region, Berbey Sign Language.  As of 2013, there is no school for the deaf in the area, but one is planned; the introduction of American Sign Language as the language of instruction may affect Douentza Sign.  A video corpus has been collected by the Max Planck Institute for Psycholinguistics to document the pre-contact form of the language.

References

Nyst, Magassouba and Sylla (2013) Deaf signers in Douentza, a rural area in Mali In: De Vos & Zeshan (2013).
Dogon Sign Language Corpus, Max Planck Institute for Psycholinguistics, Nijmegen

Sign language isolates
Sign languages of Mali